The 2020–21 Ottawa Senators season was the 29th season of the Ottawa Senators of the National Hockey League (NHL). The Senators finished the season out of the playoffs for the fourth consecutive season.

Due to the Canada–U.S. border restrictions brought in as a result of the COVID-19 pandemic, the NHL realigned its divisions. The Senators were re-aligned with the other six Canadian franchises into the newly-formed North Division. The league's 56–game season is to be played entirely within the new divisions, meaning that Ottawa and the other Canadian teams played an all-Canadian schedule for the 2020–21 regular season as well as the first two rounds of the 2021 Stanley Cup playoffs.

The Senators' season started off poorly; they began a nine-game losing streak in the second game of the season, and could not make up for the poor start, although they had a strong final month of play, finishing the season with a 10-3-1 run. In the off-season, the Senators had picked up a number of veteran free agents and traded for veteran goalie Matt Murray. The team had not played in over 10 months at the start of the season, and it showed in the long losing streak. As the season wore on, the team played more of their younger players and traded a number of the veterans at the trading deadline. Brady Tkachuk was the leading points scorer for the team and Connor Brown scored 21 goals to lead the team.

The Senators were officially eliminated from playoff contention with a 3-2 overtime loss to the Montreal Canadiens on May 2.

Team business
The team introduced three new jerseys for the season. Two were updated versions of the team's original jerseys used from 1992–1997 and a third was a "Reverse Retro" incorporating the style of the black original jersey, using red as the base colour instead.

In December 2020, the team announced a seven-year lease extension with the city of Belleville, Ontario, to host their American Hockey League affiliate, the Belleville Senators, through the 2026–27 AHL season. However, due the COVID-19 pandemic, the Belleville Senators played their delayed-start season in Ottawa at the Canadian Tire Centre instead.

As there were ongoing restrictions amidst the COVID-19 pandemic, the start of the season was delayed and the Senators were granted permission by the provincial government to play in its home arena as long as it was without spectators. Owner Eugene Melnyk made public his proposal to seat up to 6,000 fans, but withdrew the proposal after criticism.

In January 2021, former team general John Muckler passed away and was honoured at the first game. Muckler was the team's general manager when the team played in the 2007 Stanley Cup Final. Also in January 2021, the team's former head of graphic design Kevin Caradonna passed away. Caradonna had designed the "forward-facing" logo used from 1997 until 2020 and the team's mascot "Spartacat."

In February 2021, the Brampton Beast, the team's ECHL affiliate, announced that it had ceased operations permanently. The team had been one of several ECHL teams to voluntarily suspend operations before the 2020–21 season due to the COVID-19 pandemic.

Off-season
The Senators parted ways with long-time goaltender Craig Anderson, announcing that they would not offer him a new contract. The team also parted ways with forward Bobby Ryan, buying out his contract. The team did not offer contracts to Mark Borowiecki and Anthony Duclair. The team also traded players on the long-term injured list: Marian Gaborik and Anders Nilsson to the Tampa Bay Lightning, who used the contracts for salary cap relief.

On the second day of the 2020 NHL Entry Draft, the team traded for veteran Pittsburgh Penguins goaltender Matt Murray, giving up a 2020 second-round pick and Jonathan Gruden, a 2018 fourth-round pick. The team picked up several veterans in trades, including Braydon Coburn, Erik Gudbranson, Cedric Paquette, Derek Stepan, and Austin Watson. The team acquired NHL veterans Evgenii Dadonov and Alexander Galchenyuk as free agents.

Regular season
The team played its first game of the season on January 15, 2021, defeating the "Battle of Ontario" rival Toronto Maple Leafs at the Canadian Tire Centre. It was the team's first game in 310 days. The team had nine new players in the lineup, including 2020 first-round pick Tim Stuetzle. The Senators proceeded to lose nine games in a row in January, before defeating the Montreal Canadiens on February 4.

On February 15, 2021, the Senators made their first-ever comeback in team history from being four or more goals behind. The team was down 5–1 in Toronto to the Maple Leafs near the end of the second period. Nick Paul started the comeback with a shorthanded goal. In the third period, Artyom Zub scored his first NHL goal on a breakaway after exiting the penalty box. Connor Brown later scored just after a power play, and Evgenii Dadonov scored twice; first to tie the game with two minutes to play with Ottawa goalie Marcus Hogberg on the bench for an extra attacker and then scored on a breakaway to win the game 6–5 in overtime. However, he made a save while in the crease to stop Toronto's potential overtime goal.

The Senators goaltenders suffered a rash of injuries, causing the team to use five goaltenders. Matt Murray, Marcus Hogberg and Joey Daccord were all injured at one time. Daccord's injury ended his season. The Senators called up Filip Gustavsson for his first NHL game and picked up Anton Forsberg on waivers.

Prior to the trade deadline, the Senators picked up Ryan Dzingel for his second term with the team, trading Alex Galchenyuk and Cedric Paquette to the Carolina Hurricanes. At the trade deadline, well out of a playoff spot, the Senators traded several veterans for draft picks. Eric Gudranson went to the Nashville Predators for Brandon Fortunato and a 2023 seventh-round draft pick. Mike Reilly was traded to the Boston Bruins for a third-round pick in the 2022 NHL Draft. Braydon Coburn was traded to the New York Islanders for a seventh-round pick in the 2022 NHL Draft. 

Connor Brown set a team record, scoring in eight consecutive games, beating the previous record of six, held by Jason Spezza and Daniel Alfredsson.

Standings

Schedule and results

The regular season schedule was published on December 23, 2020.

Player statistics

Skaters

Goaltenders

†Denotes player spent time with another team before joining the Senators. Stats reflect time with the Senators only.
‡No longer with the Senators.

Awards and honours

Milestones

Transactions
The Senators have been involved in the following transactions during the 2020–21 season.

Trades

Free agents

Waivers

Contract terminations

Retirement

Signings

Draft picks

Below are the Ottawa Senators' selections at the 2020 NHL Entry Draft, which was originally scheduled for June 26–27, 2020 at the Bell Center in Montreal, Quebec, but was postponed on March 25, 2020, due to the COVID-19 pandemic. It was held October 6–7, 2020 virtually via Video conference call from the NHL Network studio in Secaucus, New Jersey.

References

Ottawa Senators seasons
2020–21 NHL season by team
Senators
2020 in Ontario
2021 in Ontario